Great Island is an island within Cork Harbour in Ireland.

Great Island may also refer to:
Great Island (Newfoundland and Labrador), an island in Canada
Great Island, Falkland Islands
"The Great Island" another name for Madagascar
Great Island (New Zealand), an island in Fiordland, New Zealand
Manawatāwhi / Great Island, an island in the Three Kings Islands group of New Zealand
Great Island or King's Island, an island of Enfield, Connecticut
Great Island (Massachusetts), an island of Massachusetts

See also
Great Barrier Island, an island off New Zealand